Needle Point is a mountain summit located in Union County, Oregon, US.

Description

Needle Point is located in the Wallowa Mountains and is set within the Eagle Cap Wilderness, on land managed by Wallowa–Whitman National Forest. The remote  peak ranks as the 50th-highest mountain in Oregon. The peak is situated 3.5 miles southwest of line parent Eagle Cap. Precipitation runoff from the mountain drains north to Minam River via Pop Creek, and south into headwaters of Eagle Creek. This landform's toponym has been officially adopted by the United States Board on Geographic Names.

Climate

Based on the Köppen climate classification, Needle Point is located in a subarctic climate zone characterized by long, usually very cold winters, and mild summers. Winter temperatures can drop below −10 °F with wind chill factors below −20 °F. Most precipitation in the area is caused by orographic lift. Thunderstorms are common in the summer.

See also
 List of mountain peaks of Oregon

References

External links

 Weather forecast: Needle Point
 Needle Point (photo): Flickr
 Needle Point (photo): Flickr

Mountains of Oregon
Landforms of Union County, Oregon
North American 2000 m summits
Wallowa–Whitman National Forest